The Glagolitic script (glagolitsa) is the oldest known Slavic alphabet. It is generally agreed to have been created in the 9th century by Saint Cyril, a monk from Thessalonica. He and his brother Saint Methodius were sent by the Byzantine Emperor Michael III in 863 to Great Moravia to spread Christianity among the West Slavs in the area. The brothers decided to translate liturgical books into the contemporary Slavic language understandable to the general population (now known as Old Church Slavonic). As the words of that language could not be easily written by using either the Greek or Latin alphabets, Cyril decided to invent a new script, Glagolitic, which he based on the local dialect of the Slavic tribes from the Byzantine theme of Thessalonica.

After the deaths of Cyril and Methodius, the Glagolitic alphabet ceased to be used in Moravia for political or religious needs. In 885, Pope Stephen V issued a papal bull to restrict spreading and reading Christian services in languages other than Latin or Greek. Around the same time, Svatopluk I, following the interests of the Frankish Empire, prosecuted the students of Cyril and Methodius and expelled them from Great Moravia. In 886, Clement of Ohrid (also known as Kliment), Naum, Gorazd, Angelar and Sava arrived in the First Bulgarian Empire where they were warmly accepted by the Tsar Boris I of Bulgaria. Both the Glagolitic and Cyrillic alphabets were used until 13th-14th century in Bulgaria. The Cyrillic alphabet (which borrowed some letters from the Glagolitic alphabet) was developed at the Preslav Literary School in the late 9th century. The Glagolitic alphabet was preserved only by the clergy of Croatia and Dalmatia to write Church Slavonic until the early 19th century. Glagolitic also spread in Bohemia with traces in Pannonia, Moravia and Russia.

With the adoption of Latin and Cyrillic alphabets in all Slavic-speaking countries, Glagolitic script remained in limited liturgical use for Church Slavonic in primarily Eastern Orthodoxy and Eastern Catholic Church observance, a direct descendant of Old Church Slavonic.

Name and etymology
The word glagolitic comes from New Latin  and Croatian , from Old Church Slavonic  (glagolŭ), meaning "utterance" or "word". The name was not adopted until centuries after the script's creation.

The name glagolitsa is speculated to have developed in Croatia, around the 14th century, and was derived from the word glagoljati, literally "verb (glagol) using (jati)", meaning to say Mass in Old Church Slavonic liturgy.

History

Origins

The creation of the characters is popularly attributed to Saints Cyril and Methodius, who may have created them to facilitate the introduction of Christianity. It is believed that the original letters were fitted to Slavic dialects in geographical Macedonia specifically.

The number of letters in the original Glagolitic alphabet is not known, but it may have been close to its presumed Greek model. The 41 letters known today include letters for non-Greek sounds, which may have been added by Saint Cyril, as well as ligatures added in the 12th century under the influence of Cyrillic, as Glagolitic lost its dominance. In later centuries, the number of letters dropped dramatically, to fewer than 30 in modern Croatian and Czech recensions of the Church Slavic language. Twenty-four of the 41 original Glagolitic letters (see table below) probably derive from graphemes of the medieval cursive Greek small alphabet but have been given an ornamental design.

The source of the other consonantal letters is unknown. If they were added by Cyril, it is likely that they were taken from an alphabet used for Christian scripture. It is frequently proposed that the letters sha , tsi , and cherv  were taken from the letters shin ש and tsadi צ of the Hebrew alphabet, and that Ⰶ zhivete derives from Coptic janja Ϫ. However, Cubberley suggests that if a single prototype were presumed, the most likely source would be Armenian. Other proposals include the Samaritan alphabet, which Cyril learned during his journey to the Khazars in Cherson.

For writing numbers, the Glagolitic numerals use letters with a numerical value assigned to each based on their native alphabetic order. This differs from Cyrillic numerals, which inherited their numeric value from the corresponding Greek letter (see Greek numerals).

The two brothers from Thessaloniki, who were later canonized as Saints Cyril and Methodius, were sent to Great Moravia in 862 by the Byzantine emperor at the request of Prince Rastislav, who wanted to weaken the dependence of his country on East Frankish priests. The Glagolitic alphabet, however it originated, was used between 863 and 885 for government and religious documents and books and at the Great Moravian Academy (Veľkomoravské učilište) founded by the missionaries, where their followers were educated. The Kiev Missal, found in the 19th century in Jerusalem, was dated to the 10th century.

In 886 an East Frankish bishop of Nitra named Wiching banned the script and jailed 200 followers of Methodius, mostly students of the original academy. They were then dispersed or, according to some sources, sold as slaves by the Franks. However, many of them, including Saints Naum, Clement, Angelar, Sava and Gorazd, reached Bulgaria and were commissioned by Boris I of Bulgaria to teach and instruct the future clergy of the state in the Slavic language. After the adoption of Christianity in Bulgaria in 865, religious ceremonies and Divine Liturgy were conducted in Greek by clergy sent from the Byzantine Empire, using the Byzantine rite. Fearing growing Byzantine influence and weakening of the state, Boris viewed the introduction of the Slavic alphabet and language into church use as a way to preserve the independence of the Bulgarian Empire from Byzantine Constantinople. As a result of Boris' measures, two academies, one in Ohrid and one in Preslav, were founded.

Spread and decline outside Croatia

From there, the students travelled to other places and spread the use of their alphabet. Students of the two apostles who were expelled from Great Moravia in 886, notably Clement of Ohrid and Saint Naum, brought the Glagolitic alphabet to the First Bulgarian Empire on Balkans and were received and accepted officially by Boris I of Bulgaria. This led to the establishment of the two literary schools: the Preslav Literary School and the Ohrid Literary School. Some went to Croatia (Dalmatia), where the squared variant arose and where Glagolitic remained in use for a long time. In 1248, Pope Innocent IV granted the Croatians of southern Dalmatia the unique privilege of using their own language and this script in the Roman Rite liturgy. Formally granted to bishop Philip of Senj, permission to use the Glagolitic liturgy (the Roman Rite conducted in the Slavic language instead of Latin, not the Byzantine rite), actually extended to all Croatian lands, mostly along the Adriatic coast. The Holy See had several Glagolitic missals published in Rome. Authorization for the use of this language was extended to some other Slavic regions between 1886 and 1935. In missals, the Glagolitic script was eventually replaced with the Latin alphabet, but the use of the Slavic language in the Mass continued, until replaced by modern vernacular languages.

At the end of the 9th century, one of these students of Methodius – Naum, who had settled in Ohrid, Bulgaria – is often credited, at least by supporters of glagolitic precedence, for the "creation" or wider adoption of the Cyrillic script, which almost entirely replaced Glagolitic during the Middle Ages. The Cyrillic alphabet is derived from the Greek alphabet used at that time, with some additional letters for sounds peculiar to Slavic languages (like ⟨ш⟩, ⟨ц⟩, ⟨ч⟩, ⟨ъ⟩, ⟨ь⟩, ⟨ѣ⟩), likely derived from the Glagolitic alphabet. The decision by a great assembly of notables summoned by Boris in the year 893 in favor of Cyrillic created an alphabetical difference between the two literary centres of the Bulgarian state in Pliska and Ohrid. In the western part the Glagolitic alphabet remained dominant at first. However, subsequently in the next two centuries, mostly after the fall of the First Bulgarian Empire to the Byzantines, Glagolitic gradually ceased to be used there at all. Nevertheless, particular passages or words written with the Glagolitic alphabet appeared in Bulgarian Cyrillic manuscripts till the end of the 14th century. Some students of the Ohrid academy went to Bohemia where the alphabet was used in the 10th and 11th centuries, along with other scripts. It is not clear whether the Glagolitic alphabet was used in the Duchy of Kopnik before the Wendish Crusade, but it was certainly used in Kievan Rus'.

Survival and use in Croatia

In Croatia, from the 12th century, Glagolitic inscriptions appeared mostly in littoral areas: Istria, Primorje, Kvarner, and Kvarner islands, notably Krk, Cres, and Lošinj; in Dalmatia, on the islands of Zadar, but there were also findings in inner Lika and Krbava, reaching to Kupa river, and even as far as Međimurje and Slovenia.
The Hrvoje's Missal from 1404 was written in Split, and it is considered one of the most beautiful Croatian Glagolitic books. The 1483 Missale Romanum Glagolitice was the first printed Croatian Glagolitic book.

It was believed that Glagolitsa in Croatia was present only in those areas. But, in 1992, the discovery of Glagolitic inscriptions in churches along the Orljava river in Slavonia totally changed the picture (churches in Brodski Drenovac, Lovčić, and some others), showing that use of the Glagolitic alphabet was spread from Slavonia also.

Sporadic instances aside, Glagolitic survived beyond the 12th century as a primary script in Croatia alone, although from there a brief attempt at reintroduction was made in the West Slavic area in the 14th century through the Emmaus Benedictine Monastery in Prague. The center of influence in Croatia appears to have been in the Kvarner Gulf, though the nature and extent of this influence remain subjects of debate. The early development of the Glagolitic minuscule script alongside the increasingly square majuscule is poorly documented, but before the advent of printing, a mutual relationship evolved between the two varieties; the majuscule being used primarily for inscriptions and higher liturgical uses, and the minuscule being applied to both religious and secular documents. Ignoring the problematic early Slavonian inscriptions, the use of the Glagolitic script at its peak before the Croatian-Ottoman wars corresponded roughly to the area that spoke the Chakavian dialect at the time, in addition to, to varying extents, the adjacent Kajkavian regions within the Zagreb bishopric. As a result, vernacular impact on the liturgical language and script largely stems from Chakavian sub-dialects.

Decline in Croatia

The first major threat to Croatian Glagolitic since it attained stability was from the Ottoman excursions, though the extent of cultural damage varied locally depending on the course of war. In the 17th century, though, the first successful direct attack on the script since the 12th century was headed by the Bishop of Zagreb, and after the Magnate conspiracy left the script without secular protectors, its use was limited to the littoral region. In the meantime, printing gradually overtook handwriting for liturgical manuscripts, resulting in a decline of the majuscule script, which was absorbed for titular and sometimes initial use within for minuscule documents. It was not until the late 18th century and the onset of modernity that Glagolitic received significant further threats, and through western influence, especially secular, Glagolitic culture collapsed, so that by the mid 19th century, the script was purely liturgical, relying mostly on printed materials. By the time of the devastating Italianization movements under Fascist Italy in the early 20th century, numerous independent events had already greatly reduced the area of the liturgical use of Glagolitic.

Versions of authorship and name
The tradition that the alphabet was designed by Saint Cyril and Saint Methodius has not been universally accepted. A once common belief was that the Glagolitic was created or used in the 4th century by St. Jerome (Latin: Eusebius Sophronius Hieronymus), hence the alphabet is sometimes named Hieronymian.

It is also acrophonically called azbuka from the names of its first two letters, on the same model as "alpha" + "beta" (the same name can also refer to Cyrillic and in some modern languages it simply means "alphabet" in general). The Slavs of Great Moravia (present-day Slovakia and Moravia), Hungary, Slovenia and Slavonia were called Slověne at that time, which gives rise to the name Slovenish for the alphabet. Some other, rarer, names for this alphabet are Bukvitsa (from common Slavic word "bukva" meaning "letter", and a suffix "-itsa") and Illyrian (presumably similar to using the same anachronistic name for the Illyrian (Slavic) language).

Hieronymian version
In the Middle Ages, Glagolitsa was also known as "St. Jerome's script" due to a popular mediaeval legend (created by Croatian scribes in the 13th century) ascribing its invention to St. Jerome (342–429). The legend was partly based on the saint's place of birth on the border of Dalmatia and Pannonia. He was viewed as a "compatriot" and anachronistically as belonging to the same ethnic group; this helped the spread of the cult of the saint in Dalmatia and was later used to support the idea of the presence of Slavic communities in the Eastern Adriatic Coast from ancient times, but the legend was probably firstly introduced for other reasons, like giving a more solid religious justification for the use of this script and Slavic liturgy. The theory nevertheless gained much popularity and spread to other countries before being resolutely disproven.

The epoch of traditional attribution of the script to Jerome ended probably in 1812. In modern times, only certain marginal authors share this view, usually "re-discovering" one of the already-known mediaeval sources.

Pre-Glagolitic Slavic writing systems

A hypothetical pre-Glagolitic writing system is typically referred to as cherty i rezy (strokes and incisions) – but no material evidence of the existence of any pre-Glagolitic Slavic writing system has been found, except for a few brief and vague references in old chronicles and "lives of the saints". All artifacts presented as evidence of pre-Glagolitic Slavic inscriptions have later been identified as texts in known scripts and in known non-Slavic languages, or as fakes. The well-known Chernorizets Hrabar's strokes and incisions are usually considered to be a reference to a kind of property mark or alternatively fortune-telling signs. Some "Ruthenian letters" found in one version of St. Cyril's life are explainable as misspelled "Syrian letters" (in Slavic, the roots are very similar: rus- vs. sur- or syr-), etc.

Characteristics

The phonetic values of many of the letters are thought to have been displaced under Cyrillic influence or to have become confused through the early spread to different dialects, so the original values are not always clear. For instance, the letter yu Ⱓ is thought to have perhaps originally had the sound /u/ but was displaced by the adoption of the ligature Ⱆ under the influence of later Cyrillic oѵ, mirroring the Greek ου. Other letters were late creations after a Cyrillic model. It should also be noted that Ⱑ corresponds to two different Cyrillic letters (Ѣ and Я), present even in older manuscripts, and not to different later variants of the same Cyrillic letter in different times or places.

The following table lists each letter in its modern order, showing its Unicode representation, images of the letter in both the round and angular/squared variant forms, the corresponding modern Cyrillic letter, the approximate sound transcribed with the IPA, the name, and suggestions for its origin. The Old Church Slavonic names follow the scientific transliteration, while the mostly similar Church Slavonic ones follow an approach more familiar to a generic English speaking reader. Several letters have no modern counterpart. The column for the angular variant, sometimes referred to as Croatian Glagolitic, isn't complete as some of the letters weren't used following the Croatian recension of Old Church Slavonic.

In older texts, uk and three out of four yuses also can be written as digraphs, in two separate parts.

The order of izhe and i varies from source to source, as does the order of the various forms of yus. Correspondence between Glagolitic izhe and i with Cyrillic И and І is unknown.

The Proto-Slavic language did not have the phoneme /f/, and the letters fert and fita were used for transcribing words of Greek origin, and so was izhitsa for the Greek upsilon.

Unicode

The Glagolitic alphabet was added to the Unicode Standard in March 2005 with the release of version 4.1.

The Unicode block for Glagolitic is U+2C00–U+2C5F.

The Glagolitic combining letters for Glagolitic Supplement block (U+1E000–U+1E02F) was added to the Unicode Standard in June, 2016 with the release of version 9.0:

In popular culture
Glagolitic script is the writing system used in the world of The Witcher books and video game series. It is also featured, in various uses, in several of the point and click adventure games made by Cateia Games, a Croatian game studio.
It is also featured on 1 euro cent, 2 euro cent and 5 euro cent coins minted in Croatia.

See also

 List of Glagolitic books
 List of Glagolitic manuscripts
 Relationship of Cyrillic and Glagolitic alphabets
 Glagolitic numerals
 Glagolitic Mass (by Janáček)
 George of Slavonia

References

Literature

 Franolić, Branko, and Mateo Žagar: A Historical Outline of Literary Croatian and The Glagolitic Heritage of Croatian Culture. Erasmus, Zagreb 2008. 
Fučić, Branko: Glagoljski natpisi. Croatian Academy of Sciences and Arts, Zagreb 1982.
 Fullerton, Sharon Golke: Paleographic Methods Used in Dating Cyrillic and Glagolitic Manuscripts. Ohio State University, Columbus 1971.
 Jagić, Vatroslav: Gramatika jezika hèrvatskoga. A. Jakić, Zagreb 1864.
 Japundžić, Marko: Hrvatska glagoljica. Hrvatska uzdanica, Zagreb 1998.
 Japundžić, Marko: Tragom hrvatskog glagolizma. Kršćanska sadašnjost, Zagreb 1995.
 Miklas, Heinz, Sylvia Richter, and Velizar Sadovski : Glagolitica. Österreichische Akademie der Wissenschaften, Vienna 2000. 
 Vajs, Josef: Abecedarium palaeoslovenicum in usum glagolitarum. Staroslavenska akademija, Krk 1917.
 Vajs, Josef: Rukověť hlaholské paleografie. Orbis, Prague 1932.
 Žubrinić, Darko: Crtice iz povijesti glagoljice. Hrvatsko književno društvo sv. Jeronima, Zagreb 1994.

External links

 Glagolitic text entry application
 Glagolitic manuscripts
 Croatian Glagolitic Script
 Croatian Glagolitic Script
 Glagolitic alphabet. Alternative encoding. – Proposals.
 The Glagolitic alphabet at omniglot.com
 The Budapest Glagolitic Fragments – links to a Unicode Glagolitic font, Dilyana
 Glagolitic Fonts
 Ancient Scripts: Glagolitic
 Misal 1483 – hrvatski prvotisak 
 Vrbnički statut 1380/1527
 Istarski razvod 1325/1546
 GNU FreeFont
 A simple 7-bit Squared Glagolitic font (.ttf)

Church Slavonic language
 
Alphabets
Medieval scripts
Medieval culture
Slavic culture
Great Moravia
Bulgarian Empire
Obsolete writing systems
Western calligraphy
Old Church Slavonic language
9th century in Bulgaria
Cultural history of Croatia
History of Dalmatia
History of Macedonia (region)